Touring and Automobile Club of the Islamic Republic of Iran, a non-profit organization, under supervision of Ministry of Cultural Heritage, Tourism and Handicrafts is to bring comfort and facilitate the Iranian tourists traveling abroad and foreign tourist traveling to Iran by motoring vehicles. TACI is not a membership based organization, so all the services are offered to all customers.

TACI preserves the goal of providing tourism services to all with the slogan of 'comfort and safety for travel'. It has gained valuable experiences to improve and extend its services.

Providing the tourism information for travelers, TACI has been operating the national travel Call Center (09629), and the official travel guide of Iran website (Visitiran).

Participation in international tourism and handicrafts exhibitions as representative of Iran’s Ministry of Cultural Heritage, Tourism and Handicrafts, establishing an executive secretariat for the Iran’s tourism information overseas representatives, investment and exploitation of some residential units like hotels or motels (prioritizing the historical one) are other activities of the TACI.

History 

TACI was established on 1935 after the approval of the National Assembly of Iran on December 24, 1934 and continued its activities by passing the official and registration stages in 1938 with registration number 4. After that, Iran's membership in the FIA was registered in the name of the Tourism and Automobile Club.

After the Islamic Revolution (1979) in Iran, its name was changed to the Touring and Automobile Club of the Islamic Republic of Iran (TACI).

After the Islamic Revolution, with the approval of the bill in the Supreme Council of the Revolution on November 24, 1979, the Imperial Touring Club and Automobile Club was renamed to Touring and Automobile Club of the Islamic Republic of Iran. During the years 1983 to 1993, with the formation of the Cultural Heritage, Handicrafts and Tourism Organization (which is a ministry right now), it was separated from the Ministry of Culture and Islamic Guidance and became a subset of this organization.

Also, the club has joined the Federation Internationale de l'Automobile (FIA) as the representative of Iran in 1952.

TACI was appointed as exclusive organization responsible for issuing the International Driving Permits (IDPs), issuing and guaranteeing the Carnet de Passages en Douane (CPDs), and issuing the vehicle’s Registration Certificate and the Registration Number Plates for the Iranians who travel abroad with their own vehicles.

TACI’s Roadside Assistance Services was established in 1968 with the aim of providing relief services (towing and repair) for Iranian and foreign tourists. Over the time, TACI developed its activities by providing relief services through its provincial representatives. The TACI’s roadside assistance rescuers were then deployed in the cities and roads throughout the county. Its extensive fleets of Patrols are on duty 24 hours every day.

Enjoying more than 85 years of experience in organizing the tourism rallies, foreign expeditions, etc. have made TACI a good source for the enthusiasts of touring and automobile events in Iran.

Membership in international organizations 

 FIA: 
 AIT: 
 UNWTO:

CEOs

Subsidiaries 

 Iranian Educational Institute
 Aras Travel Agency
 Zagros Investment and Tourism Institute
 Zagros International Hotel

References

1935 establishments in Iran
Organisations based in Tehran